Coprophanaeus ensifer is a species of beetles belonging to the family Scarabaeidae.

Description
This large-sized necrophagous beetle has a horn on the pronotum that is of similar size in males and females. The body colour is usually dark green.

Distribution and habitat
This species can be found in Brazil, Argentina, Bolivia and Paraguay.

References

Scarabaeidae
Beetles described in 1821